The 2018 African Women's Handball Championship was the 23rd edition of the African Women's Handball Championship, which took place from 2 to 12 December 2018 in Brazzaville, Congo. The tournament was held under the aegis of African Handball Confederation and acted as the African qualifying tournament for the 2019 World Women's Handball Championship.

Angola defeated Senegal in the final to win their second straight and 13th overall title.

Venue

Draw
The draw was held on 11 August 2018.

Preliminary round
The schedule was announced on 19 November 2018.

All times are local (UTC+1).

Group A

Group B

Knockout stage

Bracket

5th place bracket

Quarterfinals

5–8th place semifinals

Semifinals

Ninth place game

Seventh place game

Fifth place game

Third place game

Final

Final standing

Awards

All-Tournament Team

References

External links
Official website 
Results at todor66

2018
2018 in women's handball
International sports competitions hosted by the Republic of the Congo
Sports competitions in Brazzaville
African Women's Handball
2018 in African women's sport